The Mitra dynasty were several, possibly related, dynasties ruling in different regions of India:

Mitra dynasty (Ayodhya), Devamitra, sometimes called the "Late Mitra dynasty of Kosala"
Mitra dynasty (Kosambi), rulers of Vatsa (now Allahabad), c. 100 BCE–350 CE
Mitra dynasty (Mathura), rulers of Mathura, c. 150–50 BCE
Mitra dynasty (Panchala), in Pañcāla